Overstone may refer to:

Overstone, Northamptonshire, England
Samuel Jones-Loyd, 1st Baron Overstone (1796–1883), British banker and politician